Mother Mallard's Portable Masterpiece Company, formed in 1969 by David Borden, was an early synthesizer ensemble, predating groups like Tonto's Expanding Head Band and Tangerine Dream.  David Borden was in contact with Robert Moog and was one of the first musicians to use his Minimoog.  After recruiting Steve Drews and Linda Fisher to operate additional synthesizers, the group began playing concerts of minimalist music by Terry Riley, Steve Reich, and Philip Glass. They began recording their first self-titled album in 1970, but it would not be released until 1973 by Earthquack Records.  Their second album, Like a Duck to Water, was released in 1976. Borden and Mother Mallard continue performing Borden's recent and older music.

David Borden and Mother Mallard continued performing and releasing albums in the following years, most notably on the Cuneiform record label. Borden adopted new digital synthesizer technology over time, and also incorporated various acoustic woodwind instruments and voices.  Borden's most ambitious work, The Continuing Story of Counterpoint Parts 1-12, composed between 1976 and 1987, was recorded and released on three Cuneiform CDs between 1988 and 1991. The label also reissued Mother Mallard's first two 1970s recordings on CD.

Lineup
 David Borden
 Blaise Bryski
 David Yearsley
 Josh Oxford
 Conrad Alexander
 Gabriel Borden
 Lynn Pursen
Source:

Discography (Mother Mallard and David Borden)
 1973 Mother Mallard's Portable Masterpiece Co. [Earthquack]
 1998 Reissued as 1970-1973 with previously unissued recordings [Cuneiform]
 1976 Like A Duck To Water [Earthquack]
 1999 Reissued with previously unissued recordsings [Cuneiform]
 1981 Music For Amplified Keyboard Instruments [Red]
 1983 Anatidae [Cuneiform: LP only]
 1988 Migration [Cuneiform: LP only]
 1988 The Continuing Story of Counterpoint Parts 9-12 [Cuneiform]
 1990 The Continuing Story of Counterpoint Parts 5-8 [Cuneiform]
 1990 The Continuing Story of Counterpoint Parts 1-4+8 [Cuneiform]
 1992 "Double Portrait" (1987) included in collection U.S. Choice by Double Edge piano duo [CRI]
 1995 Cayuga Night Music [Cuneiform]
 1995 Places, Times, and People [Cuneiform]
 2003 Mother Mallard's Portable Masterpiece Co., music by David Borden (previously unissued 1976-77 recordings of "Counterpoint" Parts 1 & 3 and "C-A-G-E" part 3) [Arbiter]
 2005 Waterwheel (by Steve Drews) (excerpt: Film by Edin Velez, Music by Mother Mallard) included in collection Ohm+ [DVD, Ellipsis Arts]

Selected Music (Mother Mallard and David Borden)
 1959 Dialogues for trombone and trumpet
 1967 All-American, Teenage, Lovesongs for wind ensemble and tape, commissioned by Ithaca High School
 1970 Cloudscape for Peggy]
 1970 Easter for Mother Mallard ensemble]
 1972  C-A-G-E, Part I for Mother Mallard ensemble
 1974 C-A-G-E, Part II for Mother Mallard ensemble
 1975 C-A-G-E, Part II for Mother Mallard ensembleI
 1976-1987 The Continuing Story of Counterpoint, Parts 1-12 for Mother Mallard ensemble
 1978 Enfield in Summer]
 1987 Double Portrait for two pianos
 1989 Angels for vocal ensemble and Mother Mallard ensemble
 1991 Unjust Malaise  (anagram of Julius Eastman
 1994 Notes From Vienna for solo electric guitar and wind ensemble (or synthesizers) c
 1995 Cayuga Night Music
 1995 Infinity Variations for two fortepianos and chamber orchestra
 2002 Naked American  (anagram of Diane Ackerman)
 2003 K216.01a for solo electric violin and synthesizer
 2005 A Tin Haiku  (anagram of Kia-Hui Tan) n
 2007 Heaven-Kept Soul (anagram of Kathleen Supové)
 1990-2010   Earth Journeys  by David Borden
 2007 Tribute to  Ruth St. Denis and Ted Shawn
 2009 Viola Farber in Seven Movements
2010 Remembering Jimmy
2010 ESP 9461 NY
2011 FRKWYS07 [Rvng Intl], with James Ferraro, Laurel Halo, Daniel Lopatin and Sam Godin.

References

External links
Mother Mallard
Cuneiform Records David Borden/Mother Mallard page

Cuneiform Records artists
American electronic music groups